Las Paredes is a  Argentine motorsport circuit located near San Rafael, Mendoza Province.

Track history

References

External links

Motorsport venues in Mendoza Province
Sport in Mendoza Province
Buildings and structures in Mendoza Province